Quilico is a surname. Notable people with the surname include:

 Christina Petrowska-Quilico (born 1948), Canadian pianist
 Gino Quilico (born 1955), Canadian opera singer, 1996 Grammy for Best Opera Recording, son of Louis Quilico and Christina Petrowska-Quilico
 Louis Quilico (1925–2000), Canadian baritone